Kericho High School is a Kenyan boys secondary school, located in Kericho, Kericho County about 3.9kilometers from Kericho Town CBD. The current principal is Dr Daniel Chelule.

History
The school started on 15 June 1959, with eleven boys and two teachers – Mr. John Bowles the first Head teacher and Mr. Wesley Rono, the first African teacher in the school. It currently has a population of approximately two thousand students.

The school boasts of various notable alumni including:

Prof. Davy Kiprotich Koech Former and the Longest Serving CEO of  Kenya Medical Research Institute and an accomplished scientist.
Energy Cabinet Secretary Charles Keter
 First governor of Kericho County Professor Paul Chepkwony
 Kericho Senator Aaron Cheruiyot
 Former MP Benjamin Langat
 MP David Ole Sankok
 KNUT Secretary General and nominated MP Wilson Sossion
 Current principal Dr Daniel Chelule
 Belgut MP Nelson Koech

References

1959 establishments in Kenya
Buildings and structures in Rift Valley Province
Education in Rift Valley Province
Educational institutions established in 1959
Kericho County
High schools and secondary schools in Kenya
Boys' schools in Kenya